V. Sathyabama is an Indian politician and Former Member of Parliament elected from Tamil Nadu. She was elected to the 16th Lok Sabha from Tiruppur constituency as an Anna Dravida Munnetra Kazhagam candidate in the 2014 election.

References 

All India Anna Dravida Munnetra Kazhagam politicians
Living people
India MPs 2014–2019
Lok Sabha members from Tamil Nadu
Women in Tamil Nadu politics
People from Tiruppur district
21st-century Indian women politicians
21st-century Indian politicians
1972 births